Suzannah Weiss (born September 6, 1990) is a feminist writer. She has written for The New York Times,  New York Magazine, The Washington Post,  Glamour, Cosmopolitan, Elle, Playboy, and other publications. They have served as an editor for Teen Vogue, Complex, and Vice. Weiss's writing has been published in several anthologies. They are also a certified sex educator and sex/love coach.

Weiss grew up on Long Island, New York and attended Brown University, where they studied Cognitive Neuroscience, Gender and Sexuality Studies, and Modern Culture and Media. Their writing has been discussed on The Today Show and The View. They have spoken about feminist issues and sexuality at conferences including South by Southwest, on the news networks Bold TV and C-SPAN, on the web show The Fallen State, and on various radio shows and podcasts. They have played a central role in social media discussions of how women are treated by doctors.

References

External links 
 Official website
 Career Profile: Suzannah Weiss at elanalyn.com

Brown University alumni
Living people
American feminist writers
21st-century American women writers
21st-century American journalists
Feminist bloggers
1990 births
American women non-fiction writers
American women bloggers
American bloggers